This is a list of all the coniferous and broadleaf trees native to Minnesota by family.

Coniferous trees
 Cupressaceae (cypress family)
 Juniperus virginiana (eastern juniper or red cedar)
 Thuja occidentalis (eastern arborvitae or white cedar)
 Pinaceae (pine family)
 Abies balsamea (balsam fir)
 Larix laricina (tamarack larch)
 Pinus banksiana (jack pine)
 Pinus strobus (eastern white pine)
 Pinus resinosa (red pine or Norway pine)
 Picea glauca (white spruce)
 Picea mariana (black spruce)
 Tsuga canadensis (eastern hemlock)

Broadleaf trees
 Betulaceae (birch family)
 Betula alleghaniensis (yellow birch)
 Betula nigra (river birch)
 Betula papyrifera (paper birch)
 Carpinus caroliniana (American hornbeam, blue beech, ironwood)
 Ostrya virginiana (ironwood, hophornbeam)
 Fabaceae (pea family)
 Gleditsia triacanthos (honey locust)
 Gymnocladus dioicus (Kentucky coffeetree)
 Fagaceae (beech family)
 Quercus alba (white oak)
 Quercus bicolor (swamp white oak)
 Quercus ellipsoidalis (northern pin oak)
 Quercus macrocarpa (bur oak)
 Quercus muehlenbergii (chinkapin oak)
 Quercus rubra (northern red oak)
 Quercus velutina (black oak)
 Juglandaceae (walnut family)
 Carya cordiformis (bitternut hickory)
 Carya ovata (shagbark hickory)
 Juglans cinerea (butternut)
 Juglans nigra (black walnut)
 Malvaceae (mallow family)
 Tilia americana (basswood)
 Moraceae (mulberry family)
 Morus rubra (red mulberry)
 Oleaceae (olive family)
 Fraxinus americana (white ash)
 Fraxinus nigra (black ash)
 Fraxinus pennsylvanica (green ash and red ash)
 Rosaceae (rose family)
 Prunus pensylvanica (pin cherry)
 Prunus serotina (black cherry)
 Sorbus americana (American mountain ash)
 Sorbus decora (showy rowan)
 Salicaceae (willow family)
 Populus tremuloides (quaking aspen)
 Populus grandidentata (big-tooth aspen)
 Populus balsamifera (balsam poplar)
 Populus deltoides (eastern cottonwood)
 Salix nigra (black willow)
 Salix amygdaloides (peachleaf willow)
 Sapindaceae (soapberry family)
 Acer negundo (boxelder)
 Acer nigrum (black maple)
 Acer rubrum (red maple)
 Acer saccharinum (silver maple)
 Acer saccharum (sugar maple)
 Acer spicatum (mountain maple)
 Ulmaceae (elm family)
 Celtis occidentalis (hackberry)
 Ulmus americana (American elm)
 Ulmus rubra (slippery elm)
 Ulmus thomasii (rock elm)

Introduced and invasive species
Introduced and invasive species of trees include:
 Aceraceae (Maples)
 Acer ginnala (Amur maple)
 Acer platanoides (Norway maple)
 Fabaceae
 Robinia pseudoacacia (black locust)
 Rhamnaceae (Buckthorns)
 Frangula alnus (glossy buckthorn, alder buckthorn)
 Rhamnus cathartica (common buckthorn)
 Hippocastanaceae (buckeye and horsechestnut)
 Aesculus glabra (Ohio buckeye)
 Aesculus hippocastanum (European horsechestnut)
 Ulmaceae (Elm)
 Ulmus glabra (Wych elm)
 Ulmus pumila (Siberian elm)
 Pinaceae (Pine)
 Larix decidua (European larch)
 Picea abies (Norway spruce)
 Picea pungens (Colorado blue spruce)
 Pinus rigida (pitch pine)
 Pinus sylvestris (Scots pine)
 Salicaceae (willow)
 Populus alba (white poplar)
 Eleagnaceae (olive)
 Elaeagnus angustifolia (Russian olive)

References

External links

 01
Minnesota
Minnesota
Trees